Linacre is a surname. Over time, the name has been spelt a variety of different ways including: Linaker, Lineker, Linneker, Liniker, Linnecar, Leneker, Linnegar, Lineker, Lynaker, Lynacre, Lynneker and Lenniker. As of about 2016, 411 people bore one or another variant of this surname in Great Britain and 6 in Ireland; in 1881, 155 people in Great Britain bore one.

Etymology 
The surname is of medieval English origin. It originated as a locative name, given to people from places called Linacre. Such place-names in turn derive from Middle English līn ('flax') and aker ('field'), thus denoting places associated with a flax-field.

The name is first attested in the Domesday Book of 1086, which mentions a Cambridgeshire landholder named Godwin de Linacra.

The Linacre family was also prominent in the villages of Hackenthorpe and Eckington in Derbyshire in the 13th and 14th centuries. By 1881, within Great Britain, the name was mostly concentrated in Derbyshire, Lancashire, and the West Riding of Yorkshire.

People 
People that bear the surname include:

Billy Linacre (born 1924), English footballer
Sir Gordon Linacre (1920–2015), Royal Air Force officer, afterwards journalist and press baron
Harry Linacre (1880–1957), English footballer
John Linacre (born 1955), English footballer
Thomas Linacre (c.1460–1524), English humanist scholar
Gary Lineker (born 1960), English footballer

References